Leonas Apšega (born 10 December 1940) is a Lithuanian politician.  In 1990 he was among those who signed the Act of the Re-Establishment of the State of Lithuania.

References

1940 births
Living people
Lithuanian politicians
Signatories of the Act of the Re-Establishment of the State of Lithuania